The Ngurelban or Ngurai-illamwurrung are an Aboriginal Australian people of the state of Victoria.

Language
The Ngurelban language was similar to that of the Taungurung, the neighbouring tribe to their east.

Country
Ngurelban tribal territory takes in an estimated 3,000 sq. miles of land. According to Norman Tindale, it runs along the Campaspe River, has its northern boundary edging on Echuca, its western frontier probably not beyond Gunbower. It extended south of Tatura along the Goulburn River to Old Crossing (Mitchellstown), and north of Seymour.

Social organisation 
Ngurelban were organised according to three groups or clans:
 Pimpandoor to the northwest, at Colbinabbin, known for keeping their distance and for having a relationship of tense rivalry with other groups;
 Ngooraialum, a northern clan; and 
 Paboinboolok, the group at Lake Cooper.

History of contact
By the late 1830s the pressure of the effects of grazing on their pastoral lands from livestock introduced by squatters had started to create serious problems for the Ngurelban. In 1839 one of them, Moonin Moonin, complained that:
Jumbuck and Bulgana (sheep and cattle) were eating and destroying Aboriginal game pastures and staples like yams and mirr-n'yong roots.'

Alternative names
 Gunn-el-ban
 Gnurellean.
 Nouralung-bula,
 Nguralung-bula.
 Noorillim.
 Ngooraialum
 Ngurilim.
 Ooraialum ( a mishearing that dropped the initial ng-).Oorilim. Oorallim.
 Woo-ral-lim.
 Panyool.
 Paboinboolok. Panpandoor.

Notes

Citations

References

Aboriginal peoples of Victoria (Australia)
History of Victoria (Australia)